Théo Scholten (born 4 January 1963) is a retired Luxembourgian football midfielder. He became Luxembourg National Division top goalscorer in 1988–89 and was awarded Luxembourgish Footballer of the Year in 1994.

References

1963 births
Living people
Luxembourgian footballers
FC Aris Bonnevoie players
Jeunesse Esch players
FC Avenir Beggen players
CS Grevenmacher players
Association football midfielders
Luxembourg international footballers
Luxembourgian football managers
FC Swift Hesperange managers
FC Avenir Beggen managers
Jeunesse Esch managers